The music of Bangladesh spans a wide variety of styles. Bangladesh claims some of the most renowned singers, composers and producers in Asia. Music has served the purpose of documenting the lives of the people and was widely patronized by the rulers. It comprises a long tradition of religious and regular song-writing over a period of almost a millennium.

Classical music

Ragapradhan Gaan 

Bangladeshi classical music is based on modes called ragas. In composing these songs, the melodies of north Indian dingading ragas are used. As far as the Charyagiti (9th century), ragas have been used in Bengali music. Jaydev’s Gitagovindam, Padavali Kirtan, Mangal Giti, Shyamasangit, Tappa, Brahma Sangeet and Tagore songs have been inspired by Ragas. The use of north Indian ragas in Bangla songs began in 18th century. This trend gathered momentum during the 19th and 20th centuries. The pioneers of these trend were Ramnidhi Gupta, Kali Mirza, Raghunath Roy and the founder of the Bishnupur Gharana, Ramshanker Bhattacharya. Nawab of Lakhnau, Wajid Ali Shah played an important role in this trend. He was dethroned by the British empire in 1856 and banished to Metiaburuz, Kolkata. During his 30-year exile, he patronized music, specially dhrupad, tappa, thumri and kheyal. And, thus made a lasting impact on Bangladeshi music. All traditional Bengali music tend to be based on various variations of Hindustani Classical Music. Rabindranath Tagore had a deep appreciation for north Indian ragas, successfully introduced ragas in his songs. He was followed by Dwijendralal Roy, Rajanikanta Sen and Atulprasad Sen.

Folk music 

Folk has come to occupy the lives of Bangladeshis almost more than any other genre of Bengali music. Among the luminaries of the different folk traditions are Lalon Fokir, Shah Abdul Karim, Radharaman Dutta, Hason Raja, Khursheed Nurali (Sheerazi), Ramesh Shil, Kari Amir Uddin Ahmed and Abbas Uddin. Folk songs are characterised by simple musical structure and words. Before the advent of radio, entertainment in the rural areas relied on a large extent on stage performances by folk singers. With the arrival of new communication technologies and digital media, many folk songs were modernised and incorporated into modern songs (Adhunik songeet).

Folk music can be classified into several subgenres:
 Baul: mainly inspired by Lalon and almost exclusively performed by Baul mystics.
 Bhandari: Devotional music from the South (mainly Chittagong).
 Bhatiali: Music of fishermen and boatman, almost always tied by a common ragas sung solo.
 Bhawaiya: Song of bullock-cart drivers of the North (Rangpur).
 Dhamail: A form of folk music and dance originated in Sylhet. It is practiced in the Sylhet Division in Bangladesh and in areas influenced by the Sylheti culture such as the Barak Valley of Assam and parts of Tripura, Meghalaya and Manipur in India.
 Gazir Gaan: Devotional songs dedicated to Gazi Pir, who is part of Pach Pir tradition of folk practice and belief.
 Ghazal: Popular folk music of Sufi genres, introduced from philosophy and religion in music practiced mainly by Bengali Muslims.
 Gombhira: Song (originated in Chapai Nawabganj) performed with a particular distinctive rhythm and dance with two performers, always personifying a man and his grand father, discussing a topic to raise social awareness.
 Hason Raja: Devotional songs written by a music composer by the name of Hason Raja (from Sylhet, northeastern side of Bangladesh near Assam) that was recently repopularised as dance music.
 Jari: songs involving musical battle between two groups
 Jatra Pala: songs associated exclusively with plays (performed on-stage). Usually involves colourful presentations of historical themes.
 Jhumur: traditional dance song form Bangladesh and eastern part of India.
 Kavigan: poems sung with simple music usually presented on stage as a musical battle between poets.
 Kirtan: devotional song depicting love to Hindu God Krishna and his (best-known) wife, Radha.
 Lalon: best known of all folk songs and the most important subgenre of Baul songs, almost entirely attributed to spiritual writer and composer, Lalon Fokir of Kushtia. He is known to all in West Bengal of India too.(Western Bangladesh, near the border with West Bengal).
 Pala Gaan:  folk ballad also known as Pat.
 Sari: sung especially by boatmen. It is often known as workmen's song as well.
 Shyama Sangeet:  a genre of Bengali devotional songs dedicated to the Hindu goddess Shyama or Kali which is a form of supreme universal mother-goddess Durga or parvati. It is also known as Shaktagiti or Durgastuti.

Baul 

Baul is the most commonly known category of Bangladeshi folk songs. It is mostly performed by hermits who are followers of Sufism in Bangladesh. Present day Sufis earn mainly from performing their music. Baul songs incorporate simple words expressing songs with deeper meanings involving creation, society, lifestyle and human emotions. The songs are performed with very little musical support to the main carrier, the vocal. Instruments used include the Ektara ("one-string"), Dotara ("two-strings"), ba(n)shi (country flute made from bamboo) and cymbals. In recent times, Baul geeti has lost popularity, due to urbanisation and westernisation.

রবীন্দ্র সঙ্গীত (Music of Robindra) 

Rabindra Sangeet ( Robindro shonggit), also known as Tagore Songs, are songs written and composed by Rabindranath Tagore. They have distinctive characteristics in the music of Bengal, popular in India and Bangladesh. "Sangeet" means music, "Rabindra Sangeet" means Songs of Rabindra.

Rabindra Sangeet used Indian classical music and traditional folk music as sources.

নজরুল গীতি  (Music of Nazrul) 

Nazrul Geeti or Nazrul Sangeet, literally "music of Nazrul," are songs written and composed by Kazi Nazrul Islam, a Bengali poet and national poet of Bangladesh and active revolutionary during the Indian Independence Movement. Nazrul Sangeet incorporate revolutionary notions as well as more spiritual, philosophical and romantic themes.

শাহ আবদুল করিম  (Music of Shah Abdul Karim) 

Shah Abdul Karim known as "Baul Samrat" or king of baul music, he has composed over 1600 baul songs, some of his notable songs include Keno Piriti Baraila Re Bondhu, Murshid Dhono He Kemone Chinibo Tomare, Nao Banailo Banailo Re Kon Mestori, Ashi Bole Gelo Bondhu and Mon Mojale Ore Bawla Gaan. He referred to his compositions as Baul Gaan. He holds voice against unfairness, injustice, prejudice and communalism through his writings. Karim portraits Bhati area's people love, wish and happiness amid the writings. He got inspiration from another legendary musician Fakir Lalon Shah. Karim wrote many spiritual songs including Marfati or Dehatatta. Bangla Academy has translated ten songs of his in the English language. Karim wrote many spiritual songs including Marfati or Dehatatta. Bangla Academy has translated ten songs of his in English.

লালন গীতি  (Music of Lalon) 

Lalon also known as Fakir Lalon Shah, Lalon Shah, Lalon Fakir. Lalon composed numerous songs and poems, which describe his philosophy. Lalon left no written copies of his songs, which were transmitted orally and only later transcribed by his followers. Also, most of his followers could not read or write either, so few of his songs are found in written form.

Pop music 
Western style popular music began to influence strongly the music of Bangladesh in the early 1970's. And then several recording studios were established in Dhaka, which produced many pop style songs about national heroes. Ferdous Wahid, who started out as a singer in the early 1970s, said "I wanted to introduce western music in Bangladesh, so after the Liberation War I decided to do pop music for our country’s people".

Azam Khan, Fakir Alamgir, Ferdous Wahid, Pilu Momtaz, Najma Zaman, and Firoz  Shai are considered the pioneer who brought the glory to  Bangladesh pop music. In particular, Azam Khan is known as the pop-guru or pop-samrat of Bangladesh.

In the genre of film music, well-known are such singers as Sabina Yasmin, Runa Laila, Andrew Kishore and so on. Sabina Yasmin has won Bangladesh National Film Award for Best Female Playback Singer 14 times, and Runa Laila has won the award 7 times. On the other hand, Andrew Kishore has won Bangladesh National Film Award for Best Male Playback Singer 8 times.

Rock

Instruments

Common instruments are:
 Sitar
 Violin
 Flutes
 Harmonium
 Esraj (a traditional Bengali instrument)
 Ektara ("one-string")
 Dotara ("two-strings")
 Khamak
 Dhak
 Dhol

See also
 Bengali folk literature
 Culture of Bengal
 Culture of India
 Culture of West Bengal
 History of Bengali literature
 Music of Bengal
 Music of West Bengal
 Bangladeshi rock
 Bangladeshi hip hop
 List of Bangladeshi musicians
 List of Bangladeshi playback singers
 Shah Abdul Karim

References

 
Bengali music
Sylhet Gitika